The TCU–Texas Tech football rivalry is an American college football rivalry between the TCU Horned Frogs football team of Texas Christian University (TCU), and the Texas Tech Red Raiders football team of Texas Tech University. The winner of the annual game is presented with the Saddle Trophy, a traveling icon which bears plaques marking the score of each meeting between the rival schools. The teams have met on the gridiron in 63 games since 1926. The "West Texas Championship - Saddle Trophy" was first awarded, from 1961 through 1970.  During this ten-year stretch, the schools split the series 5–5. The trophy was lost and the rivalry name disappeared for decades until the moniker and trophy were reintroduced in 2017.This football game is known as the West Texas Championship - Battle for the Saddle Trophy.

History
From 1926 through 1955, TCU and Texas Tech frequently played as non-conference opponents.

In 1956, Texas Tech joined the Southwest Conference (SWC), and the teams played annually as conference opponents, except in 1957 (as Texas Tech was not a full member of the SWC until 1960), until the conference's dissolution in 1995.

After the dissolution of the SWC, the teams played a home-and-home series in 2004 and 2006 with the home team winning each time (Texas Tech in 2004, TCU in 2006).

In 2012, TCU joined the Big 12 Conference and the teams renewed their annual rivalry.

Texas Tech leads the overall series 32–29–3. TCU led the series 10-6 in the early years, 1926-1959. During Southwest Conference play in 1960-1995, Texas Tech led the series 21-12-3 (the series' 3 ties came in 3 straight games in Lubbock in 1979, 1981 and 1983). As members of different conferences during 1996-2011, the two teams met twice and split, 1-1. In Big 12 competition 2012-2021, TCU holds a 6-4 lead.

The series has featured many close games and some games with large margins of victory. Texas Tech holds the overall largest victory margin in the series with 56 points in a 63–7 win on November 9, 1985, in Lubbock. Tech's next largest victory margin was a 35-point margin in a 70-35 victory on September 18, 2004, also in Lubbock. TCU's largest victory margin was by 55 points in an 82–27 victory in Fort Worth on October 25, 2014. The 82 points scored was the most points ever scored against Texas Tech and the most points ever scored against any team in Big 12 history. The Frogs and Raiders have only met twice with both teams ranked in the top 25, in 2006 and 2012. Both games were played in Fort Worth and won by the higher-ranked team (TCU 12–3 in 2006 and Texas Tech in 3OT 56–53 in 2012).

Game results
Rankings based on the Associated Press Poll released prior to the game.

See also  
 List of NCAA college football rivalry games

References 

College football rivalries in the United States
TCU Horned Frogs football
Texas Tech Red Raiders football
1926 establishments in Texas